Igrapiúna is a municipality in the state of Bahia in the North-East region of Brazil.

The municipality contains 2.52% of the  Baía de Camamu Environmental Protection Area, created in 2002.

See also
List of municipalities in Bahia

References

Populated coastal places in Bahia
Municipalities in Bahia